Penoyre House, Battle, Powys, Wales is a nineteenth century country house.  Designed by Anthony Salvin for Colonel John Lloyd Vaughan Watkins, it was built between 1846-8.  In an Italianate style, it is described by Mark Girouard as "Salvin's most ambitious classical house".  The enormous cost of the house almost bankrupted the family and it was sold only 3 years after Colonel Watkins's death.  From 1947, the house was in institutional use, and was converted to apartments in the early twenty-first century.  The building is Grade II* listed The gardens are listed Grade II on the Cadw/ICOMOS Register of Parks and Gardens of Special Historic Interest in Wales.

History

John Lloyd Vaughan Watkins (1802–65) was a nineteenth century Welsh Liberal politician who sat Member of Parliament for Brecon. and was High Sheriff of Brecknockshire and Lord Lieutenant of Brecknockshire.  Watkins inherited a late eighteenth century house from his father, the Reverend Thomas Watkins, and engaged Salvin to undertake a complete rebuilding from 1846-8.  The cost of the house alone was over £33,000 and Allibone records that Watkins was obliged to "close (it) and live cheaply in a local hotel."  Only three years after his death in 1865, the house was sold.  Privately owned from 1868 to 1947, the house was then used as a school, the clubhouse to a golf club, a nursing home, an hotel and a rehabilitation centre.  In the early twenty-first century, the house was converted to apartments.

Architecture
The house is designed in an Italianate style, echoing Sir Charles Barry's Trentham Park and Thomas Cubitt's Osbourne House.  Girouard calls it "Salvin's most ambitious classical house". It has a three-storey main block, a "colossal" entrance tower with a belvedere top, and a balancing conservatory wing which had a glass-domed roof, although this was replaced in 1899.

Notes

References
 
 
 

Country houses in Powys
Grade II* listed buildings in Powys
Registered historic parks and gardens in Powys
Anthony Salvin